Oenothera californica, known by the common name California evening primrose, is a species of flowering plant in the evening primrose family.

Distribution
The plant is native to regions of southern and western California, the Southwestern United States, and Baja California, Mexico. It is found in desert and chaparral and woodlands habitats.

Desert ecoregions include the Mojave Desert, Sonoran Desert, and Great Basin Desert.

Chaparral and woodlands ecoregion locations include the southern California Coast Ranges, San Francisco Bay Area, Transverse Ranges, Channel Islands, and Peninsular Ranges.

Description
Young plants have a basal rosette of leaves, while older ones have leaves along the stem, lance-shaped to nearly oval in shape and up to 6 centimeters long.

Flowers occur in the upper leaf axils, drooping in bud and becoming erect as they bloom. The four petals are white, fading pink, and may exceed 3 centimeters long.

Subspecies
There are currently three subspecies of Oenothera californica:

 Oenothera californica ssp. avita  — desert regions.
 Oenothera californica ssp. californica — eastern and Southern California
 Oenothera californica ssp. eurekensis  — Eureka Dunes evening primrose.

Eureka Dunes evening primrose

Oenothera californica ssp. eurekensis, the rare Eureka Dunes evening primrose, is a federally listed endangered species endemic to only a few occurrences in the Eureka Valley Sand Dunes in the Eureka Valley of Inyo County, eastern California. It grows alongside another local dune endemic, the endangered Eureka Valley dune grass (Swallenia alexandrae). It is sometimes listed as its synonym Oenothera avita ssp. eurekensis.

The Eureka Valley Sand Dunes are within Death Valley National Park. The main threat to the Eureka Dunes evening primrose was off-road vehicle use. That threat has been reduced and the plant's population has improved, but is still threatened by other human activities and an invasive species of tumbleweed, Prickly Russian thistle (Kali tragus). The United States Fish and Wildlife Service had recommended the plant be removed from the endangered species list.

The former subspecies Oenothera californica ssp. arizonica [], is now considered to be a separate species, Oenothera arizonica [].

References

External links
Calflora Database: Oenothera californica (California evening primrose)
Jepson Manual eFlora (TJM2) treatment of Oenothera californica
U.C. CalPhotos gallery of Oenothera californica

californica
Night-blooming plants
Flora of California
Flora of Arizona
Flora of Baja California
Flora of Nevada
Flora of Utah
Flora of the California desert regions
Flora of the Great Basin
Flora of the Sonoran Deserts
Natural history of the California chaparral and woodlands
Natural history of the Mojave Desert
Natural history of the Peninsular Ranges
Natural history of the Transverse Ranges
Natural history of Inyo County, California
Death Valley National Park
IUCN Red List endangered species
Taxa named by Sereno Watson
Plants described in 1876